Georgia is an unincorporated community located within Freehold Township in Monmouth County, New Jersey, United States. Exit 22 on Interstate 195 provides access to Georgia via Jackson Mills Road (County Route 23). There is also a road in the area called Georgia Road (CR 53), leading to Turkey Swamp Park. Georgia sits at the northern reaches of the Pine Barrens and numerous housing developments are located north and east of the settlement.

References

Neighborhoods in Freehold Township, New Jersey
Unincorporated communities in Monmouth County, New Jersey
Unincorporated communities in New Jersey